Masters of Hardcore is the name of a Dutch hardcore music label and of its related music festival events.

Label 
Masters of Hardcore music label was founded in 1995 in the Hemkade in Zaandam by DJ Outblast and King Matthew.
Bass-D & King Matthew teamed up with other famous DJs like Paul Elstak and Buzz Fuzz.

Events 

In 1998, after a low profile period, the label Masters of Hardcore started to organize their parties as an independent and Bass-D & King Matthew decided to continue to produce Hardcore Music on the Masters of Hardcore label.
Their first party was successful.
Masters of Hardcore organized a lot of parties in big music festival locations in the Netherlands (the Beursgebouw in Eindhoven, and the PBH-Hallen in Zuidlaren). There also were parties in Germany (Dortmund Westfalenhalle, the event is called Syndicate now) and in Switzerland (different cities over the years).

Anthem 
 2004 - Base Alert - Zoo (Netherlands, Beursgebouw Eindhoven)
 2004 - Outblast feat. Korsakoff - Unleash The Beast (Netherlands, Thialf Stadion Heerenveen)
 2005 - Angerfist - The World Will Shiver (Netherlands, Thialf Stadion Heerenveen)
 2005 - Re-Style - Hardcore Psychopaths (Germany, Westfalenhallen Dortmund)
 2006 - Bass-D and King Matthew - The Genesis (Netherlands, Den Bosch, Brabanthallen)
 2006 - DaY-már - Embrace The Night (Germany, Westfalenhallen Dortmund)
 2007 - The Stunned Guys - Raise Cain (Netherlands, Den Bosch, Brabanthallen)
 2008 - Outblast - Infinity (Netherlands, Den Bosch, Brabanthallen)
 2008 - DaY-már - Pole Position (Netherlands, Assen, TT Hall)
 2009 - Catscan - Design The Future (Netherlands, Den Bosch, Brabanthallen)
 2009 - Noize Suppressor - Pole Position Lap II (Netherlands, Assen, TT Hall)
 2010 - Angerfist & Outblast - The Voice of Mayhem (Netherlands, Den Bosch, Brabanthallen)
 2010 - The Stunned Guys & Amnesys - Symphony of Sins (Belgium, Hasselt, Ethias Arena)
 2011 - Dyprax feat. MC Tha Watcher - Statement of Disorder (Netherlands, Den Bosch, Brabanthallen)
 2011 - Angerfist - The Depths of Despair (Belgium, Antwerp, Loto Arena)
 2012 - State of Emergency - The Vortex of Vengeance (Netherlands, Den Bosch, Brabanthallen)
 2012 - Korsakoff - The Torment of Triton (Belgium, Antwerp, Lotto Arena)
 2013 - Re-Style - The Conquest of Fury (Netherlands, Den Bosch, Brabanthallen)
 2014 - Tha Playah feat. MC Tha Watcher - Eternal (Netherlands, Den Bosch, Brabanthallen)
 2015 - Bodyshock feat. MC Jeff - Legacy (Netherlands, Den Bosch, Brabanthallen)
 2016 - Miss K8 & MC Nolz - Raiders of Rampage (Netherlands, Den Bosch, Brabanthallen)
 2017 - Destructive Tendencies - The Skull Dynasty (Netherlands, Den Bosch, Brabanthallen)
 2018 - Angerfist & The Watcher - Tournament of Tyrants (Netherlands, Den Bosch, Brabanthallen)
 2019 - N-Vitral & Sovereign King - Vault of violence (Netherlands, Den Bosch, Brabanthallen)
 2020 - DJ Mad Dog & Dave Revan - Magnum Opus (Netherlands, Den Bosch, Brabanthallen)
 2022 - DJ Mad Dog & Evil Activities - Immortal (Netherlands, Den Bosch, Brabanthallen)

References

External links 
 Official Site
 Official Site Australia

Record labels established in 1995
Dutch record labels
Hardcore (electronic dance music genre)